Wilson Miao  (born April 12, 1987) is a Canadian politician who serves as the member of parliament for Richmond Centre. He was elected to the House of Commons in the 2021 federal election as a member of the Liberal Party.

Early life and education 
Miao immigrated to Canada from Hong Kong in 1996.

He grew up in Richmond, British Columbia, and went to Simon Fraser University for business administration. 

Prior to his election, he worked in corporate marketing and as a real estate agent in the Lower Mainland.

Wilson speaks Cantonese, Mandarin, and English.

Political career 
After being acclaimed as the Richmond Centre Liberal Candidate, Miao declared his priorities to be advocacy for seniors, newcomers and youth. He reaffirmed that a more affordable and comfortable retirement for seniors is a critical issue for Canadians. During the 2021 campaign he said “I’m hoping I have the chance to listen to more people and bring back that voice to Ottawa”. 

Miao went on to win over the Conservative incumbent Alice Wong by less than 700 votes.  

In his maiden speech in the House of Commons, Miao emphasized the importance of the House acting as a united front to “create real change and meaningful process”. He currently sits on two parliamentary standing committees: Veteran Affairs and International Trade.

In January 2023, Miao opened his constituency office in Richmond Centre after a lengthy time without an office. He faced significant criticism for his lack of availability to his constituents, particularly during his first 18 months in office. His office also racked up the largest renovation bill of any member of parliament.

Electoral history

References

External links

21st-century Canadian politicians
Canadian real estate agents
Hong Kong emigrants to Canada
Members of the House of Commons of Canada from British Columbia
Liberal Party of Canada MPs
Living people
People from Richmond, British Columbia
Simon Fraser University alumni
Year of birth missing (living people)